Tim Duckworth (born June 18, 1996) is an American-born decathlete, born to British parents, who competes internationally for Great Britain. He was the 2018 US Collegiate heptathlon Champion indoors where he set a British national indoor record and also he is the NCAA Decathlon Champion outdoors, with a score of 8336, Duckworth is the 3rd highest scoring decathlete in British history. In his senior debut for Great Britain at the 2018 European Athletics Championships he finished 5th and he won his first senior international medal, the silver medal, at the 2019 European Athletics Indoor Championships.

References

External links

1996 births
Living people
Track and field athletes from California
American male decathletes
American male long jumpers
British decathletes
British male long jumpers
British Athletics Championships winners
Kentucky Wildcats men's track and field athletes